Haft Cheshmeh (also known as Gaftracheshma, Guftachashmeh, and Haft Chāshmeh) is a village in Qebleh Daghi Rural District, Howmeh District, Azarshahr County, East Azerbaijan Province, Iran. At the 2006 census, its population was 1,755, in 387 families.

References 

Populated places in Azarshahr County